The House of Contarini is one of the founding families of Venice and one of the oldest families of the Italian Nobility. In total eight Doges to the Republic of Venice emerged from this family,  as well as 44 Procurators of San Marco,  numerous ambassadors, diplomats and other notables. Among the ruling families of the republic, they held the most seats in the Great Council of Venice from the period before the Serrata del Maggior Consiglio when Councillors were elected annually to the end of the republic in 1797. The Contarini claimed to be of Roman origin through their patrilineal descendance of the Aurelii Cottae, a branch of the Roman family Aurelia, and traditionally trace their lineage back to Gaius Aurelius Cotta, consul of the Roman Republic in 252 BC and 248 BC.

Family
The House of Contarini is one of the twelve founding families of the Venetian Republic, the apostolic families, and were and remain through extended family consanguinity present in the Veneto's population, represented in over twenty auxiliary and cadet noble branches that include ranks currently among European sovereign, royal and aristocratic descendants.

853 AD marks the first officially verified documentation of the Contarini in the Republic of Venice, with Andrea Contarini named in the testament of Orso Partecipazio, son of Giovanni I Participazio. According to manuscripts in the Biblioteca Marciana and the family archives the Contarini claim direct descent of the Roman gens Aurelii Cottae through Publius Aurelius Cotta, son of Marcus Aurelius Cotta (consul in 74 BC and maternal uncle of Julius Caesar), who transferred his family to Padua. His grandson, Lucius Aurelius Cotta was elected prefect of the Reno; the area around the Reno near Bologna. His first and second son and his male grandchildren continued in this position and added the cognomen Reno, becoming Cotta Reno or Cottareno. The last person to register Cottareno was Marcus Aurelius Cottareno in Padua in 290 AD and subsequently the family name was written as Contareno, or Contarini in Venetian (both the Latin and Venetian denomination of the family name have been used interchangeably since).
In 338 AD Marcus Aurelius Contareno (or Marco Aurelio Contarini in Venetian), prefect of Concordia under Constantine I, was the first Contarini to permanently move his residence to the Venetian area. In 425 another Marcus Aurelius Contarini took part in the third Consular Triumvirate of Rialto, following the invasions of the Goths under Alaric I, who from 402 pillaged the rich provinces of Istria and Venetia and sacked Rome in 410. From the outset the affairs of the early exiles in the islands of the Venetian lagoon were managed by Roman Consuls elected at Padua, including the Contarini. Following the invasion by the Huns of Attila in 452 and the destruction of the large Roman cities of Padua and Aquileia, the islands became a more permanent refuge for the swelling number of exiles.  In 466 the exiles decided upon a form of self-government through the annual election of Tribunes, who ultimately in 539 came under Byzantine rule through the Exarch of Ravenna, forming a loose association of islands with its capital in Eraclea. According to tradition, in 697 under the guidance of the Patriarch of Grado, twelve Tribunes ruling the Byzantine district of Venice elected the first Doge in Eraclea, forming the independent Republic of Venice. One of these Tribunes was Marcus Aurelius Contarini. Twentieth century studies, however, cast doubt on the historicity of the first Doge Paolo Luccio Anafesto and his successor Doge Marcello Tegalliano, suggesting that only following the murder of the Byzantine viceroy Paul Exarch of Ravenna, did the inhabitants of the islands chose their first Doge, Orso Ipato from Eraclea. Whoever was historically the first, the Contarini family has since the earliest Venetian chronicles been associated with the birth of the Republic and election of the first Doge. They formed part of the 'duodecim nobiliorum proles Venetiarum' (or the 'twelve noblest families of Venice') and the 12 apostolic families, the oldest of the 247 patrician families in the Great Council following the Serrata of 1297. As the first inhabitants in the lagoon came from what were provinces of Rome in the 5th century, the Rialto initially being governed by a Consular Triumvirate elected at Padua and subsequently by Tribunes who were elected from among the most prominent members in their former Roman communes, it is not uncommon among the oldest Venetian patrician families to find Roman ancestry (e.g.  descended from gens Sulpicii Quirini, Marcello descended from gens Claudii Marcelli), families who often kept their praenomina traditions and preserved their genealogy. The older branch Aurelli Cottae of the gens Aurelia came to prominence with the election of Gaius Aurelius Cotta as consul in 252 BC and again in 248 BC during the First Punic War and by the time Publius Aurelius Cotta moved to Padua four of his patrilineal ancestors, including his father, had achieved consulship in the Roman Republic.

In the Republic of Venice in 1043 Domenico I was elected and became the first Doge in the family Contarini. By 1797, when the last Doge was forced to abdicate, the family had produced eight Doges of their own - the greatest number of Doges in one family. The Contarini count as well 44 Procurators of San Marco, the second most prestigious life appointment after that of the Doge, plus various important ambassadors, diplomats, cardinals and navy commanders among them (in the famous Battle of Lepanto no less than 6 ships were commanded by Contarini). The Republic, in one form or another, lasted as a functioning independent state for over 1100 years until Napoleon's march into Venice sounded its demise. Like Carthage, Athens and Rome, Venice overcame a territorial disadvantage, grew into a great city, and from a great city became a great empire. The power of Carthage was chiefly maritime, that of Athens chiefly military; but Rome and Venice obtained supremacy both by sea and land. Marvellously in advance of her contemporaries in all her institutions and ideas. The Contarini led the Venetian Republic forward through ever changing ages and commensurate with ample changes in trade, technology, trade, science, religion, art, banking and finance as well as in diplomacy and war.

Andrea Palladio, who was employed by the Contarini and their relatives, designed several of the most outstanding neo-classical structures in the Veneto's environs. Importantly, his works satisfied his clients, which, full-circle, he had helped to create. Many such works are found to have often favored a minimalist, if neo-classical, dialog among their design elements. A passion for purity of line, scale and proportion were fundamental to and codified in Palladio's I quattro libri dell'architettura, detailing vital points of design interest for architecture and decoration enthusiasts and professionals, and remains used by architecture students even today.

Surviving branch in Sicily 
A branch remains in Sicily today. With the arrival of Alvise Contarini in Syracuse at the invitation of Martin I of Sicily this branch of the family was established in Sicily in 1394, the year in which Alvise married Cesarea Modica of Baron Pietro di Modica. Alvise Contarini was given the fiefdoms of San Giacomo Belmineo and Solarino as part of the dowry. In 1406 he was elected mayor of Syracuse, followed by numerous other communal, ministerial and military official positions for his descendants in the Kingdom of Sicily and the Kingdom of Italy after the Risorgimento. In Sicily the family carries the title Duke .

Notable members
 Marco Aurelio Contarini, Roman consul elected at Padua, took part in the third Consular Triumvirate of Rialto, from 425 to 426
 Aurelio Contarini, son of Marco Aurelio, moved to the Venetian Lagoons following invasion of Attila and became Tribune of Rialto in 453
 Marco Aurelio Contarini, one of 12 Tribunes who elected the first Doge in 697 at the initiation of the Patriarch of Grado
 Luigi Contarini, Procurator of San Marco in 864
 Antonio Contarini, Procurator of San Marco in 865
 Contarino Contarini, Tribune of Choggia in 880
 Marco Contarini, son of Teodosio, Procurator of San Marco in 899
 Marino Contarini (d. 953), Patriarch of Grado in 919
 Giovanni Contarini, Ambassador to Pope John XII in 959
 Marco Contarini, son of Giovanni, Procurator of San Marco in 991
 Domenico Contarini (d. 1074), Bishop of Olivolo or Rialto from 1044 to 1074
 Domenico I Contarini (d. 1071), 30th Doge of Venice from 1043 to 1071
 Domenico Contarini, son of Giovanni, Bishop of Venice from 1070 to 1091
 Enrico Contarini (d. 1108), Bishop of Castello from 1074 to 1108
 Marco Contarini (d. 1149), son of Giovanni, Procurator of San Marco in 1143
 Bertucci Contarini, captain in the fleet of doge Enrico Dandolo, conquering Zadar in 1202 and Constantinople in 1204 during the Fourth Crusade
 Jacopo Contarini (1194–1280), 47th Doge of Venice from 1275 to 1280
 Marino Contarini (d. 1293), Procurator of San Marco in 1286
 Nicolo Contarini, Procurator of San Marco in 1299
 Alberto Contarini, Procurator of San Marco in 1300
 Nicolo Contarini (d. 1331), Procurator of San Marco in 1326
 Elisabetta Contarini, wife of Doge Francesco Dandolo, dogaressa of Venice from 1328 to 1339
 Stefano Contarini (d. 1352), Procurator of San Marco in 1347
 Zaccaria Contarini, diplomat and Bailo of Constantinople in 1349
 Maffio Contarini, Governor (Provvedittore) of Albania in 1355
 Andrea Contarini (d. 1382), 60th Doge of Venice from 1368 to 1382
 Antonio Contarini (d. 1386), Bishop of Adria from 1384 to 1386
 Lorenzo Contarini, Procurator of San Marco in 1377
 Andrea Contarini (d. 1443), Ambassador in Rome to Pope Gregory XII in 1406, the first Venetian Pope
 Girolamo Contarini, Governor of Verona in 1408
 Antonio Contarini (d. 1441), Governor of Zadar and played an important role in regaining control of Zadar in 1409 from Hungary
 Alvise Contarini, Mayor of Syracuse in 1406
 Luigi (Lodovico) Contarini, senator of the Kingdom of Sicily from 1414
 Andrea Contarini, executed in 1430 by hanging between the two red pillars of the Palazzo Ducale following his failed assassination attempt on Doge Francesco Foscari
 Marino Contarini (d. 1455), Bishop of Kotor in 1430, Bishop of Treviso in 1453
 Stefano Contarini, diplomat and Procurator of San Marco in 1441
 Federico Contarini, diplomat and Procurator of San Marco in 1445
 Nadalino Contarini, Procurator of San Marco in 1459
 Leonardo Contarini, Procurator of San Marco in 1449
 Bartolomeo Contarini (15th century), Governor of the Duchy of Athens on behalf of Francesco I Acciaioli
 Ambrogio Contarini (1429–1499), Ambassador to Sultan of Persia Uzun Hasan from 1473 to 1476
 Maffio Contarini (d. 1460), Patriarch of Venice from 1456 to 1460
 Andrea Contarini, Procurator of San Marco in 1463
 Scipione Contarini, Bishop of Torcello from 1471 to 1485
 Giovanni Matteo Contarini, Governor of Albania in 1466
 Contarina Contarini, wife of Doge Nicolò Marcello, dogaressa of Venice from 1473 to 1474
 Francesco Contarini, Governor of Albania in 1475 
 Federico Contarini, Provveditore of the Venetian Navy in 1482 
 Gasparo Contarini (1483–1542), diplomat and Bishop of Belluno from 1536 to 1542 
 Bertucci Contarini (d. 1490), Procurator of San Marco in 1485 
 Girolamo Contarini, Provveditori of the Venetian Navy in 1495 
 Giovanni Matteo Contarini (d. 1507), cartographer who designed the 1506 Contarini–Rosselli map
 Zaccaria Contarini, Ambassador to King Charles VIII of France in 1491
 Lodovico Contarini, Patriarch of Venice in 1508
 Antonio Contarini (d. 1524), Patriarch of Venice from 1508 to 1524 
 Bartolomeo Contarini, Ambassador to Ottoman Sultan Selim I in 1517 
 Carlo Contarini, Ambassador to Archduke Ferdinand I in 1523
 Bernardo Contarini, Bailo of Nafplio in 1524
 Giovanni Contarini, Provveditori of the Venetian Navy in 1528
 Luigi Contarini, Bailo of Nafplio in 1531
 Paolo and Francesco Contarini, patricians who commissioned the Villa Contarini in Piazzola sul Brenta in 1546
 Giovanni Contarini (1549–1605), painter of the Venetian School
 Giacomo Contarini (1536–1595), Venetian patron and collector of mathematical instruments
 Pietro Contarini, Bishop of Paphos in 1557, Bishop of Cyprus in 1562
 Giulio Contarini (d. 1580), Procurator of San Marco in 1537
 Marc' Antonio Contarini, Ambassador to Holy Roman Emperor Charles V from 1529 to 1533, Ambassador in Rome to Pope Paul III in 1538
 Alessandro Contarini (d. 1553), Procurator of San Marco in 1538
 Tomasso Contarini, Governor of Verona in 1541, Procurator of San Marco in 1557
 Giulio Contarini, Bishop of Belluno from 1542 to 1575
 Pietro Francesco Contarini, Patriarch of Venice from in 1554
 Tomasso Contarini, Procurator of San Marco in 1558
 Tomasso Contarini, Ambassador to Holy Roman Emperor Charles V in 1535 and Procurator of San Marco in 1543
 Francesco Contarini, Ambassador to Pope Paul IV in 1555, Ambassador to Holy Roman Emperor Charles V and Procurator of San Marco in 1556
 Francesco Contarini, Bishop of Paphos in 1562, Bishop of Cyprus in 1570
 Luigi Contarini (d. 1579), Ambassador to the Duke of Ferrara in 1569, Ambassador to King Charles IX of France in 1577
 Federico Contarini, Procurator of San Marco in 1570
 Leonardo Contarini, Ambassador in Germany in 1571
 Girolamo Contarini, Procurator of San Marco in 1571
 Cecilia Contarini, wife of Doge Sebastiano Venier, admiral of the fleet at the Battle of Lepanto, dogaressa of Venice from 1577 to 1578
 Tomaso Contarini (d. 1617), Governor of Vicenza in 1589, later Ambassador to the Dutch Republic, Ambassador to Holy Roman Emperor Rudolf II, Ambassador to Pope Paul V 
 Zaccaria Contarini, Ambassador to Pope Gregory XIV in 1590, Ambassador to Pope Clement VIII in 1596, Procurator of San Marco in 1599
 Giovanni Paolo Contarini, Procurator of San Marco in 1594
 Tommaso Contarini, Archbishop of Candia from 1597 to 1604
 Girolamo Contarini, Bishop of Capo d'Istria from 1600 to 1619
 Bernardo Contarini, Procurator of San Marco in 1602
 Pietro Contarini, Ambassador to Charles Emmanuel I, Duke of Savoy in 1606
 Tomaso Contarini, Ambassador to Pope Paul V in 1612
 Piero Contarini, Ambassador to Holy Roman Emperor Rudolf II in 1606, Ambassador to Pope Paul V, Ambassador to King James I of England in 1617 
 Simone Contarini, Bailo of Constantinople in 1608, Ambassador to King Louis XIII of France in 1617, Ambassador to Holy Roman Emperor Ferdinand II in 1619, Procurator of San Marco in 1620, Ambassador to King Philip IV of Spain in 1621, Ambassador to Sultan Mustafa I in 1622, Ambassador to King Louis XIII of France in 1625
 Gasparo Contarini, Ambassador to the Dutch Republic in 1608
 Alvise Contarini, Ambassador to Pope Paul V in 1613
 Francesco Contarini (1556–1624), 95th Doge of Venice from 1623 to 1624
 Angelo Contarini (d. 1657), Ambassador to King Charles I of England in 1625, Ambassador to Pope Urban VIII in 1629, Ambassador to the Holy Roman Emperor Ferdinand III in 1637, Ambassador to Louis XIII of France in 1638, Ambassador to Pope Urban VIII in 1640, Procurator of San Marco in 1642, Ambassador to Pope Urban VIII in 1642, Ambassador to Pope Innocent X in 1646
 Alvise Contarini (1597–1651), Ambassador to King Charles I of England in 1627, Ambassador to King Louis XIII of France, Ambassador to Pope Urban VIII in 1632, Bailo of Constantinople in 1636, mediator in Congress of Munster from 1641 until signing of Peace of Westphalia in 1648
 Nicolò Contarini (1553–1631), 97th Doge of Venice from 1630 to 1631
 Giorgio Contarini, Governor of Vicenza in 1638
 Andrea Contarini, son of Doge Carlo Contarini, Procurator of San Marco in 1645, Ambassador to King John II Casimir Vasa of Poland in 1649, Ambassador to Pope Clement IX in 1667 and to Pope Clement X in 1670
 Tomaso Contarini, Provveditore of Dalmatia in 1647
 Angelo Contarini, Governor of Verona in 1649
 Giulio Contarini, Procurator of San Marco in 1651
 Francesco Contarini, Governor of Verona in 1651
 Vicenzo Contarini, Ambassador to England (Council of State) in 1653
 Giacomo Contarini, Governor of Verona in 1653
 Carlo Contarini (1580–1656), 100th Doge of Venice from 1655 to 1656
 Girolamo Contarini, Captain of galleon in 1657, Provveditore of Dalmatia and Albania in 1667
 Domenico II Contarini (1585–1675), 104th Doge of Venice from 1659 to 1675
 Marco Contarini (d. 1689), Procurator of San Marco in 1662
 Carlo Contarini, Ambassador to King Charles II of Spain
 Alvise Contarini (1601–1684), 106th Doge of Venice from 1676 to 1684
 Domenico Contarini, Ambassador to Holy Roman Emperor Leopold I
 Carlo Contarini, Procurator of San Marco in 1685
 Pietro Contarini, Procurator of San Marco in 1701
 Girolamo Contarini, Provveditore of Corfu in 1701
 Luigi Contarini, Procurator of San Marco 1703
 Antonio Contarini, Governor of Verona in 1713
 Polissena Contarini da Mula, wife of Doge Alvise Giovanni Mocenigo, dogaressa of Venice from 1771 to 1778
  (1841–1908), mayor of Agrigento and senator for life, Kingdom of Sicily

See also
Ca' d'Oro, Venice
Palazzo Correr Contarini Zorzi
Palazzo Contarini del Bovolo, Venice
Villa Contarini in Piazzola sul Brenta
Contarini Fleming, a novel by the British prime minister Benjamin Disraeli

References

Italian noble families
Surnames
Republic of Venice families